Danyel Waro, fyer bâtard (in English, Danyel Waro, the Proud Bastard) is a 2002 documentary film.

Synopsis 
In Réunion, there's no need to introduce Danyel Waro, his rhythms and texts have left their mark on the cultural landscape of the past twenty years. Behind the public image, the singer, there's a man with strong convictions, a poet, a craftsman. Unknown facets that Thierry Hoarau's film reveals. An intimate portrait of a strong, appealing personality.

References 

2002 films
French documentary films
2002 documentary films
Documentary films about African music
2000s French films